Dave Leduc (born 13 December 1991) is a Canadian Lethwei fighter who competes in the World Lethwei Championship, where he is the former WLC Cruiserweight World Champion. He is also the undefeated Openweight Lethwei World Champion under traditional rules. Leduc gained widespread notoriety by becoming the first Canadian to win in the controversial Prison Fight. In 2016, he travelled to Myanmar to achieve his dream of fighting Burmese bareknuckle boxing, considered the world's most brutal sport. Leduc challenged and defeated Tun Tun Min, who was then recognized as the best in the world and became the first non-Burmese to win a Lethwei Golden Belt. The same year, he married Moldovan writer and model Irina Terehova in a nationally televised traditional Burmese wedding ceremony in Yangon with approximately 30 million viewers in Myanmar.

Early life 
Born in Gatineau, Leduc starting playing baseball at a young age. In 2005, Leduc represented Outaouais in Baseball at the Summer Quebec Games in Amos and won the bronze medal. He also played in the United States as a pitcher. In 2011, at nineteen years old, Leduc was managing a nightclub in Ottawa and owned a limousine company.

Before Lethwei 
Sanda

In 2009, at the age of seventeen, a disagreement with his father caused Leduc to leave home. He began learning Sanda at Kung Fu Patenaude under the guidance of Sifu Patrick Marcil. and competing in amateur fight nights. The application of Jeet Kune Do principles into Leduc's striking style forged his unpredictable and unorthodox style. Early on, Leduc started training headbutts combinations and adding bareknuckle bag sessions into his training, setting himself up for his future career in Lethwei.

 Mixed martial arts

In 2013, Leduc started fighting MMA in Canada and went undefeated in amateur in his three fights, winning two of them by submission via guillotine choke. His last win was against Tristar Gym fighter and Georges St-Pierre's protege, Yukinori Akazawa, which he won by unanimous decision.

In 2014, Leduc made his pro debut against future UFC welterweight fighter Jonathan Meunier. Having never cut weight as an amateur, Leduc gave a noticeable size advantage to his opponent and fought at his walking weight 171lbs. He lost the fight by referee stoppage in the first round and would return to the cage in November 2015 to face future Pancrase & ONE Championship title contender Koyomi Matsushima, this time attempting to drop down to 155lbs. Leduc stated his inexperience in cutting weight made him stay for an excessive amount of time in sauna and briefly lost consciousness exiting the sauna. Severely dehydrated and weakened, Leduc missed the 155lbs weight limit by 3lbs, but the fight was still on. At the fight, Leduc threw a kick while his opponent was charging forward, which brought both men on the ground. Matsushima fell into Leduc's triangle choke and while trying to tighten the choke, Leduc got caught by a hammer fist. Matsushima won TKO into the first round.

 Muay Thai (2013–2016)

In 2013, Lethwei being illegal in the province of Quebec and having difficulty getting a fight in Myanmar, Leduc went on his first trip to neighboring Thailand to begin his professional career.

In 2016, Myanmar's lack of training facilities led Leduc to leave everything behind and moved to Phuket, Thailand in order to train at Tiger Muay Thai. Leduc was invited to the 2016 Tiger Muaythai Tryouts and went on to win a place on the professional fight team, along with teammate Dan Hooker.

Prison Fight: Fight For Freedom  

On July 12, 2014, Leduc took part in the controversial Prison Fight, where inmates can reduce their sentences and even earn their freedom by winning a series of fights against foreign fighters. The Prison Fight event is sanctioned by the Thai Department of Corrections and described as a way for inmates to battle their way to an early release. The event took place in the maximum security Klong Pai Central Prison, in Nakhon Ratchasima, two hours north of Bangkok. Leduc faced Thahan Chor.Chatchai who was an experienced Muay Thai fighter who competed multiple times at Lumpini Stadium, but was arrested and  incarcerated for trafficking methamphetamine. Leduc won by unanimous decision and left the top of his opponent's head lacerated because of repetitive elbow strikes.

When it came to fighting convicts, Leduc said to the Bangkok Post that he wouldn't feel bad if he won and his rival's sentence weren't reduced. Leduc explained to Argentinian news Infobae the mentality of the inmates at the Prison Fight events, saying:

In 2017, Leduc's prison fight was featured in the Showtime documentary Prison fighters: 5 Rounds To Freedom. The film is narrated by Sons of Anarchy star Ron Perlman and aims at examining a controversial practice in Thailand's criminal justice system.

Lethwei career

2016

1st Myanmar Lethwei World Championship 
On August 21, 2016, Leduc was invited to make his Lethwei debut at the 1st Myanmar Lethwei World Championship in Yangon, Myanmar, against Too Too, (34-0) undefeated, 75 kg Lethwei World Champion. Leduc took the country by storm by completely dominating the fight, which ended in a draw according to traditional Lethwei rules. With his performance, Leduc won the heart of the Myanmar people.

Championship pursuit 
After his dominant performance over Too Too, Leduc challenged Myanmar star Tun Tun Min, at the time, the openweight Lethwei world champion. The match was held at Thein Pyu Stadium and organized by Great Tiger Group (GTG). Tun Tun Min was the heavy favorite heading into this title defense against Leduc. Tun Tun Min started strong and dominated the early rounds. In the later rounds, Leduc came back and floored his opponent a few times. The match was closely contested and ended in a draw according to traditional Lethwei rules. After the match, Tun Tun Min was quoted saying that he had difficulties with Dave's control of distance, but that he was confident to put on a better performance in their rematch in December 2016.

Going for gold 

On December 11, 2016, their very anticipated rematch took place at the Air KBZ Aung Lan Championship in Yangon, Myanmar. The two previously fought in October to a draw, but the rematch was sweetened by an added bonus: ownership of the Openweight Golden Belt. Leduc opened the fight offensively, landing his signature fake roundhouse kick to sidekick and a counter elbow on Tun Tun Min's face soon after the opening bell. Following these attacks, the spectators witnessed an exceptional show of respect by Tun Tun Min, his usual bull rushing style was replaced by a noticeable slower pace. The round continued with aggressive attacks from both sides. Leduc executed multiple counters and takedowns and continually striking Tun Tun Min's knee with his front kick, resulting in the weakening of his leg. In round three, seeing an opening in a high kick, Leduc caught Tun Tun Min's overextended leg and flipped him to the floor twisting his knee, forcing his team to call his time-out. The third round continued with a visibly shaken Tun Tun Min. After a short exchange in the clinch followed by a final takedown, Tun Tun Min was not able to continue and forfeit. Leduc was awarded the Golden Belt, becoming the first non-Burmese fighter to hold the Lethwei openweight world title.

 Documentary 

The journey to the world title was captured by Canal D as part of the French documentary La Fosse aux Tigres which aired in November 2017. The documentary follows Leduc training and traveling to Yangon to win the Lethwei world title.
The movie was filmed in Canada, Thailand and Myanmar.

2017

Lethwei in Japan 

 Lethwei in Japan 2: Legacy 

On February 16, 2017, for the second event organized by the International Lethwei Federation Japan Leduc headlined Lethwei in Japan 2 at the Korakuen Hall in Tokyo Dome City, Japan.

Leduc defended his title for the first time against veteran Lethwei fighter Phoe Kay. In the first round, Leduc performed a vicious spinning elbow knockout, forcing Phoe Kay's corner to call the permitted time out. They revived him and the fight continued, but Phoe Kay looked hurt. In the second round, after several knockdowns, Leduc ended the match by KO, winning his first title defense.

The Japanese people loved the brutality and aggression of Lethwei, and more events were announced to be held in Tokyo.

 Lethwei in Japan 3: Grit 

On April 18, 2017, for his second title defense, Leduc faced Turkish Australian fighter Adem Yilmaz at Lethwei in Japan 3 in Tokyo, Japan under traditional Lethwei rules. This match was the first Lethwei world title fight headlining two non-Burmese in the sport's history. For the occasion, the Ambassador of Myanmar to Japan was present at the event held in the Korakuen Hall.

In the first round, Leduc came out dominant over Yilmaz, scoring two knockdowns and landing a strong headbutt in the clinch. In the second round, Leduc dislocated his right index finger in the clinch. The cornerman did not replace his bones and Leduc was not able to use his right hand the rest of the fight. Leduc managed to land elbows and many headbutts on Yilmaz before the final bell.

After five rounds, the fight was declared a draw according to Lethwei rules, with Leduc earning the up draw for drawing blood and executing all four knockdowns of the match. The Japanese crowd and the near 13 million viewers watching, were made aware of Leduc's injury, which made the fight exciting and earned him the respect of the fans.

 Lethwei in Japan 4: Frontier 

For his third straight title defense, Leduc was set to face American Veteran Cyrus Washington at Lethwei in Japan 4 in Tokyo, Japan.

The American challenger Cyrus Washington announced he was pulling out of the fight citing a hand injury he sustained during training. Following this news, Leduc's opponent changed to 2016 & 2017 SUPER Muaythai Champion Nilmungkorn Sudsakorngym from Thailand. Nilmungkron and Leduc exchanged words at the pre-fight press conference, where Nilmungkorn stated that: he will win the first Japanese Lethwei Belt. The matchup was billed as Lethwei vs. Muaythai. Leduc was quoted saying "It’s lethwei versus Muaythai. I will finish Nilmungkorn off very quickly and show the world that lethwei is the most devastating form of striking".

In front of a sold out Tokyo Dome City Hall, the 25-year old made a noticeable entrance dressed as the grim reaper. Leduc kept his promise and dominated his opponent, winning by knockout at 2m:23sec of the second round. In the first round, Leduc landed a head butt on Nilmungkorn which disoriented him. This was shorty followed by his signature right kick to right punch move, hitting Nilmungkorn on the jaw forcing him to use his time-out. In the second round, Leduc proved too much for the veteran Thai fighter, ending the match with a knee to the face.

Back in Myanmar 
During Leduc's rise in Lethwei, fans often entertained the idea of a match with Cyrus Washington and pushed for a fight between the two. Having been the only other fighter to score a win over Tun Tun Min, Leduc agreed to a clash with the crafty Lethwei veteran in order to solidify his legacy.

"I respect Cyrus a lot, he is a crafty veteran, he has fought some of the best fighters of the sport, but he has never fought anyone like me. I am not like the others, I’m the King of Lethwei and he wants a taste of the crown", Leduc said in an interview.

On August 20, 2017, Leduc faced Cyrus Washington inside the Thuwunna National Indoor Stadium in Yangon, Myanmar, to defend his openweight Lethwei world title, at the Myanmar Lethwei World Championship. With more than 100 fights on his record, Washington was the more experienced fighter of the two with Leduc having only 22 fights. Leduc dominated by applying pressure, drawing blood, and backing his opponent down. Washington spent rest of the fight running from Leduc and going to the mat at every engagement of the clinch trying to protect his badly cut forehead from any further damage. The fight was declared a draw under traditional Lethwei rules marking Leduc's fourth title defense in eight months.

Aung Lan Championship 
Historically, the Air KBZ Aung Lan Golden Belt Championship was a kryptonite event for Lethwei champions, Leduc having won the title by defeating Tun Tun Min, who had won it from Saw Nga Man on the same stage. On 10 December, marking exactly one year after becoming champion, Leduc faced former WKN heavyweight world champion, Frenchman Corentin Jallon. "This time I keep the belt. Fighting him is gonna be like a crocodile bringing a gazelle in the water." Leduc said. Inside the Thein Pyu Stadium in Yangon, Leduc executed his ceremonial fight dance Lethwei yay, announcing the start of the match. Just before the first exchange, Leduc challenged Jallon with the Lekkha moun. The Frenchman automatically replied with a flurry of punches, which Leduc countered with an accurate elbow counterattack. In the third round, Leduc executed a diving headbutt which landed directly Jallon's right eye, drawing blood. In the fourth round, Leduc had Jallon bent over the ropes from trying to avoid a head butt. While he had Jallon's back, Leduc did a provocative humping movement. The Myanmar crowd reacted strongly to the scene, clapping and cheering.

Leduc punished Jallon for the duration of the fight, opening deep cuts, and showcasing his signature headbutts in the clinch. The fight was declared a draw according to Lethwei rules and Leduc retained the openweight Lethwei World champion title. This fight marked his fifth consecutive title defence of 2017.

2018

Chasing the 4th title 

On 19 August 2018, at the 3rd Myanmar Lethwei World Championship, Leduc returned to face former Rajadamnern Stadium, WPMF and IKF Champion Diesellek TopkingBoxing inside the Thein Pyu Stadium in Yangon, Myanmar.

The matchup was mediatized as Lethwei vs Muaythai. With more than 200 fights to his record, Diesellek was the more experienced fighter of the two, with Leduc having only 24 fights. For this fight and for the first time in his career, Leduc flew his longtime trainer Sifu Patrick Marcil to Myanmar. Prior to the bout, Leduc said in an interview that he respected Diesellek's left kick, having knocked out current Lumpini Stadium and Rajadamnern Stadium champion Youssef Boughanem in brutal manner at Lumpini Stadium in 2012.

The fight started with some exchanges in the clinch, with Diesellek trying the first headbutt of the fight which missed and Leduc landing a left uppercut. Leduc continued with a fake right knee, fake left knee, followed by a right elbow, knocking out his opponent. Diesellek's corner called for the allowed injury time-out and woke him up. The fight resumed with a surprisingly energetic Diesellek, landing a left kick to Leduc's face. Shortly after, Leduc threw a fake kick to punch, closing the distance, followed by a knee to jaw knocking out Diesellek. Leduc won by KO at 2:23 of the first round, making this his sixth title defence. Leduc raised the Myanmar flag in the ring and helped Diesellek get back to his corner before being awarded the (MLWC) Myanmar Lethwei World Championship Openweight belt.

Tun Tun Min trilogy 

On December 16, 2018, the very anticipated third  between Tun Tun Min took place at the Air KBZ Aung Lan Golden Belt Championship in Yangon. The third fight saw Leduc fighting out of the red corner, the first time a foreigner has been able to do so in the history of Lethwei, as it is customary to have non-Burmese fighters come out of the blue corner. Tun Tun Min was fully recovered, but had tremendous difficulty with the distance control of Leduc. At 1:28 seconds of the first round, Leduc landed a headbutt to the temple in the clinch which floored Tun Tun Min, but managed to get up at the count of eight.

At the 2:35 of the same round, Leduc executed a jumping elbow strike and knocked out Tun Tun Min for 43 second.  His team had to call for the 2-minute injury time-out to revive him and attend to a cut above his right eye. Tun Tun Min came back to the fight visibly frustrated at not being able to land on Dave leading him to attempt a flying roundhouse kick and other acrobatic feats in an attempt to slow down his rival. The later rounds saw both boxers vying for a finish but ended without another knockout at the final bell and Leduc retained his title.

2019

World Lethwei Championship 
In 2017, Leduc expressed his disagreement on WLC's modern Lethwei rules via an open letter on social media. The WLC is using the modern Lethwei rules implemented in 1996, and removed controversial injury time-out.

Relinquishing the titles 
On March 9, 2019, despite a long-running feud with the promotion, Leduc announced that he had signed an exclusive contract with the World Lethwei Championship.  The exclusive contract would make it impossible for him to defend his various world titles. On March 25, 2019, Leduc held a press conference at the Karaweik Palace in Yangon, Myanmar announcing that he was relinquishing three of his four Lethwei world titles. The three titles in question included the MLWC Title, Air KBZ Aung Lan Championship title and the ILFJ Openweight Lethwei World title, but keeping the Golden Belt, therefore remaining the Openweight Lethwei World Champion under traditional rules.

WLC debut 
For his promotional debut, Leduc was offered to face TUF 11 & TUF 25 competitor and UFC veteran Seth Baczynski. The bout was scheduled as the main event of WLC 9: King of Nine Limbs in Mandalay, Myanmar for the inaugural Cruiserweight World Lethwei Championship. Baczynski felt confident leading up to the fight because he had significantly more fighting experience than Leduc. On August 2, 2019, Leduc landed an elbow strike which exploded Bacynski's left ear and then knocked him out with punches to win the inaugural Cruiserweight World Lethwei Championship. Following his performance, Leduc was invited on The Joe Rogan Experience podcast by Joe Rogan and both men discussed Lethwei. Leduc announced that the WLC had plans to host an event in the United States.

Spotlight on Lethwei 
After winning the world title, Leduc dedicated his career solely to Lethwei and has been at the forefront of the sport's rise in international popularity. Leduc expressed his hopes that Lethwei fighters will remain true to the traditions of the martial art as it grows in popularity. In 2017, Leduc helped the opening of gyms throughout the country and promoting Lethwei outside of Myanmar.

On 8 October 2017, Myint Htwe, Minister of Health and Sports of Myanmar, awarded Leduc with a certificate of honor in recognition for his efforts as a proponent of Myanmar's national sport, being on the forefront of Lethwei's expansion internationally.

ONE Championship offer

In 2016, after carving his way to the top of Lethwei and claiming, As reported by Business Insider, Leduc received offers from ONE Championship CEO Chatri Sityodtong, who wanted to recruit Leduc in the promotion, but would only accept if the organization would host Lethwei fights, stating, "I need to stay focused on Lethwei. I like fighting with no gloves and with headbutts: that’s my passion."

 Leduc Lethwei 

In 2017, Leduc founded Leduc Lethwei and brought its first international team of fighters from Brazil and Costa Rica to Myanmar, at the occasion of the Myanmar Lethwei World Championship.

 Fighting style 

Leduc has an unorthodox and aggressive striking style. He is known for his accurate elbow strikes and to have perfected the art of the headbutt. as well as taunting and provoke his opponents during the fight. Leduc is referred to as the King of Lethwei He has adopted the Burmese lifestyle, and is often seen wearing a Longyi. This contributed to the Myanmar people welcoming the idea of having a foreigner as the champion of their national sport.

 Instructor lineage 

Bruce Lee → James DeMile → Jaques Patenaude → Patrick Marcil → Dave Leduc

Outside the ring

Wedding 
In 2016, Leduc met Moldovan writer and model Irina Terehova when she traveled to Thailand. The two had never met before, but after writing a story on Leduc, Terehova decided to leave Canada and meet him in Phuket. In October 2016, Leduc got engaged to Terehova on the Shwesandaw Pagoda in Bagan, Myanmar. On December 13, 2016, the couple got married in a nationally televised traditional wedding ceremony live on MRTV in Yangon, only two days after his world championship title fight. The ceremony was watched by approximately 30 million people in Myanmar, catapulting the couple to superstars in Myanmar.

Charity 
Leduc's relationship and marriage to Terehova, who has been famous in her own right as a writer for MTL Blog, have contributed to his celebrity beyond Lethwei. In 2017, Leduc and Terehova started getting involved with children at NLD AIDS center in Yangon, who are infected with HIV/AIDS, bringing them chocolate and treats, as well as giving undisclosed donations.

Controversy

Burmese bank note incident
In 2018, Leduc made headlines after posting a fan art on social media, showing of a 1000-kyats note with a picture of him printed on it, suggesting that the Central Bank of Myanmar was issuing a sports celebratory note with him on it. The announcement went viral and outraged the Myanmar population because of the sensitive nature of the issue. After the 8888 Uprising, the government redesigned the national currency removing the picture of General Aung San, replacing it with Chinthe and elephants. The military regime in the 1990s tried to eradicate all traces of Aung San's memory, considered the father of modern-day Myanmar and who was assassinated by political rivals six months before independence on Jan. 4, 1948. Leduc was severely criticized, receiving multiple threats before going public and explaining the strategy behind his stunt, saying his goal was to revive the debate about bringing back Aung San on the currency. After his explanation, Leduc's tactic was acclaimed.

On 4 January 2020, to mark the 72nd anniversary of Myanmar's Independence Day, the Central Bank of Myanmar issued the new 1000-kyats notes displaying General Aung San after being absent for 30 years.

Buakaw feud 
On April 28, 2021, Leduc stirred controversy with a profanity-laced social media post criticizing Muay Thai, iconic Muay Thai fighter Buakaw Banchamek and historical figure Nai Khanom Tom. In the post, he criticizes Muay Thai as being as a "softened version of Burmese Boxing" and claims Muay boran as being copied from traditional Lethwei. Furthermore, he insinuates that the claims surrounding Nai Khanom Tom are exaggerated and that he was simply a prisoner in ancient Burma. Ultimately, he claims that Lethwei is the superior art to Muay Thai. He issues a challenge to Buakaw to a single-round, nine-minute fight. As of January 2022, his challenge has not been answered.

His post sparked considerable backlash from the Muay Thai and combat sports community. As a result of his comments, the Myanmar Traditional Lethwei Federation handed Leduc a two-year ban on Lethwei competition both in Myanmar and overseas. His offer to become the Ambassador of Lethwei in Cyprus was also revoked. According to the MTLF, Leduc had "committed personal attacks" on Buakaw Banchamek, in addition to making disparaging claims about Muay Thai, potentially tarnishing the relationship between Myanmar and Thailand with his comments on social media.

Television

The Amazing Race Canada 
In 2019, before headlining WLC 9, Leduc competed with his wife Irina Terehova on The Amazing Race Canada Season 7. The couple made it clear that they weren't on the show for the prize money or to make friends, it was apparently Leduc's desire since teenage to compete on the show. Undoubtedly the most controversial seasons of the Canadian franchise, Dave & Irina became the most notorious villains the franchise has known, while being practically unbeatable for the entire season. The couple outraged a lot of viewers and were deemed "un-Canadian". They fell out of favour of viewers and fellow racers for their cutthroat way of racing, copying an answer at the Horne Lake Caves Provincial Park and stealing cabs in Yellowknife, Northwest Territories. The couple later revealed receiving death threats when the show aired. They generated a remarkable amount of hate from Canadian viewers for referring to other contestants as peasants. After arriving first in Edmonton, Alberta, Leduc said “We’ll let the peasants fight for last place.”, which became the title of episode 3.

In the first episode of the season, in Kamloops, British Columbia, the couple quickly stood out and became the season's villains after trash-talking Canada’s Choice Jet & Dave. Jet told Leduc about being a firefighter which he replied “That’s great because you will be back there next week.”, which ended up being true. In the fifth episode, in Nanaimo, Vancouver Island, the remaining contestants teamed up and tried send the Quebec couple home, but as Leduc said, it was a “drastic failure.” Despite a well-laid plan against the couple and a record number of penalties taken by multiple teams, it was ultimately the Halifax twins who got eliminated.

Dave and Irina led the charge out of Thunder Bay to Wolfville, Nova Scotia, but faltered at the apple sorting challenge and were eventually the last team to meet host Jon Montgomery at the mat at Luckett Vineyards.

Filmography

Championships and accomplishments 

Championships

Lethwei World Champion
 Openweight Lethwei Golden Belt
Nine successful title defenses
  World Lethwei Championship
 WLC Cruiserweight World Championship (One time, inaugural)
 Air KBZ Aung Lan Championship
 Two successful title defenses Vacated in 2019
 International Lethwei Federation Japan
 ILFJ Openweight World Championship (One time, inaugural) Vacated in 2019
 Myanmar Lethwei World Championship 
 MLWC Openweight World Championship (One time) Vacated in 2019
 Sparta Sports and Entertainment 
 Sparta Lethwei Championship

Awards, records, and honours

 Lethwei
 First non-Burmese Golden Belt champion
 Certificate of honor awarded by Myint Htwe, Minister of Health and Sports of Myanmar
 Competed in the first Lethwei World Championship title fight in North America 
 First Lethwei fighter on the Cover of Karaté Bushido magazine.
 2019 Top 10 Sport Moments in Canada's National Capital Region
 World Lethwei Championship
 First Canadian-born WLC Champion
 2019 Top 3 Knockout of the Year
 2019 Fight of the Year 
 Lethwei World
 2019 Lethwei Person of the Year
 2019 Event of the Year 
Spia Asia Awards
 2019 Best Sport Tourism Destination Campaign - Bronze 
Asian Academy Awards
 2019 Best Sport Program - National Winner

Lethwei record 

|-  style="background:#cfc;"
| 2020-11-07 || Win ||align=left| Cyrus Washington || Sparta Wyoming IV || Cheyenne, Wyoming || TKO || 4 || 2:40
|-
! style=background:white colspan=9 |
|-  style="background:#cfc;"
| 2019-08-02|| Win ||align=left| Seth Baczynski || WLC 9: King of Nine Limbs || Mandalay, Myanmar || KO || 2 || 2:35
|-
! style=background:white colspan=9 |
|-  style="background:#c5d2ea;"
| 2018-12-16|| Draw ||align=left| Tun Tun Min || 2018 Air KBZ Grand Final Myanmar Championship || Yangon, Myanmar || Draw || 5 ||
|-
|-  style="background:#cfc;"
| 2018-08-19 || Win ||align=left| Diesellek TopkingBoxing || 2018 Myanmar Lethwei World Championship || Yangon, Myanmar || KO || 1 || 2:23
|-
! style=background:white colspan=9 |
|-  style="text-align:center; background:#c5d2ea;"|-  style="background:#c5d2ea;"
| 2017-12-10 || Draw ||align=left| Corentin Jallon || 2017 Air KBZ Aung Lan Championship || Yangon, Myanmar || Draw || 5 ||
|-  style="background:#c5d2ea;"
| 2017-08-20 || Draw ||align=left| Cyrus Washington || 2017 Myanmar Lethwei World Championship || Yangon, Myanmar || Draw || 5 ||
|-  style="background:#cfc;"
| 2017-06-16 || Win ||align=left| Nilmungkorn Sudsakorngym || Lethwei in Japan 4: Frontier || Tokyo, Japan || KO || 2 || 2:23
|-
! style=background:white colspan=9 |
|-  style="background:#c5d2ea;"
| 2017-04-18 || Draw ||align=left| Adem Yilmaz || Lethwei in Japan 3: Grit || Tokyo, Japan || Draw || 5 ||
|-  style="background:#cfc;"
| 2017-02-16 || Win ||align=left| Phoe Kay || Lethwei in Japan 2: Legacy || Tokyo, Japan || KO || 2 || 2:32
|-  style="background:#cfc;"
| 2016-12-11 || Win ||align=left| Tun Tun Min || 2016 Air KBZ Aung Lan Championship || Yangon, Myanmar || TKO (Forfeit) || 3 || 2:34
|-
! style=background:white colspan=9 |
|-  style="background:#c5d2ea;"
| 2016-10-09 || Draw ||align=left| Tun Tun Min || GTG International Challenge Fights || Yangon, Myanmar || Draw || 5 ||
|-  style="background:#c5d2ea;"
| 2016-08-21 || Draw ||align=left| Too Too || 2016 Myanmar Lethwei World Championship || Yangon, Myanmar || Draw || 5 ||
|-
| colspan=9 | Legend:

Muaythai record 

|-  style="background:#cfc;"
| 2016-09-12 || Win ||align=left| Sakchay Saksoonton || Patong Boxing Stadium || Phuket, Thailand || TKO || 2 ||
|-  style="background:#cfc;"
| 2016-06-22 || Win ||align=left| Pechsila || Bangla Stadium || Phuket, Thailand || TKO || 3 ||
|-  style="background:#cfc;"
| 2016-06-05 || Win ||align=left| Farhad Alamdarnezam || Rawai Boxing stadium || Phuket, Thailand || KO || 2 ||
|-  style="background:#cfc;"
| 2016-05-14 || Win ||align=left| Sakchay Saksoonton || Rawai Boxing stadium || Phuket, Thailand || KO || 5 ||
|-  style="background:#cfc;"
| 2016-04-25 || Win ||align=left| Chaiyo Thalangyanyeung || Patong Boxing stadium || Phuket, Thailand || KO || 2 ||
|-  style="background:#cfc;"
| 2016-04-02 || Win ||align=left| Carlos Prates || Rawai Boxing Stadium || Phuket, Thailand || Decision || 5 ||
|-  style="background:#cfc;"
| 2016-03-14 || Win ||align=left| Hiden Dragon Muay Thai || Bangla Stadium || Phuket, Thailand || KO || 2 ||
|-  style="background:#cfc;"
| 2016-02-16 || Win ||align=left| Kwangpet For Vichanchai || Rawai Boxing Stadium || Phuket, Thailand || KO || 3 || 
|-  style="background:#cfc;"
| 2016-01-16 || Win ||align=left| Dennua Aawut || Patong Boxing Btadium || Phuket, Thailand || KO || 2 ||
|-  style="background:#cfc;"
| 2014-07-12 || Win ||align=left| Thahan Chor.Chatchai || Prison Fight || Klong Pai Central Prison, Thailand || Decision || 3 || 
|-  style="background:#cfc;"
| 2014-06-29 || Win ||align=left| Vladislav Markov || Bangla Stadium || Phuket, Thailand || KO || 1 ||
|-  style="background:#cfc;"
| 2014-05-16 || Win ||align=left| Anthony Yudtajak || Bangla Stadium || Phuket, Thailand || KO || 4 ||
|-  style="background:#fbb;"
| 2014-03-12 || Loss ||align=left| Jake Lund || Bangla Stadium || Phuket, Thailand || Decision || 5 ||
|-  style="background:#cfc;"
| 2014-02-26 || Win ||align=left| Andres Da Forno || Bangla Stadium || Phuket, Thailand || TKO || 2 || 
|-  style="background:#cfc;"
| 2014-02-17 || Win ||align=left| Jackrid Sitkrujaroon || Patong Boxing Stadium || Phuket, Thailand || KO || 1 ||
|-  style="background:#cfc;"
| 2013-03-29 || Win ||align=left| James Lion Muaythai || Bangla Stadium || Phuket, Thailand || TKO || 2 ||
|-
| colspan=9 | Legend:

Professional mixed martial arts record

|-

|Loss
|align=center| 0–2
|Koyomi Matsushima
|TKO (punches)
|Hybrid Pro Series 3
| 
|align=center|1
|align=center|0:19
|Gatineau, Canada
|
|-
|Loss
|align=center| 0-1
|Jonathan Meunier
|TKO (punches)
|Hybrid Pro Series 2
| 
|align=center|1
|align=center|3:36
|Gatineau, Canada
|
|-

Amateur mixed martial arts record

|-

|Win
|align=center| 3–0
|Yukinori Akazawa
|Decision (unanimous)
|Fightquest 25
| 
|align=center|3
|align=center|3:00
|Kahnawake, Canada
|
|-
|Win
|align=center| 2-0
|Jared Albu
|Submission (guillotine choke)
|Hybrid 17
| 
|align=center|3
|align=center|1:05
|Gatineau, Canada
|
|-
|Win
|align=center| 1-0
|Mitch Beekman
|Submission (guillotine choke)
|Hybrid 16
| 
|align=center|1
|align=center|2:37
|Gatineau, Canada
|
|-

References

External links

 
 
 

Canadian Lethwei practitioners
French Quebecers
1991 births
Sportspeople from Gatineau
Canadian people of French descent
The Amazing Race Canada contestants
Canadian television personalities
Canadian male kickboxers
Canadian male mixed martial artists
Welterweight mixed martial artists
Mixed martial artists utilizing sanshou
Mixed martial artists utilizing Jeet Kune Do
Mixed martial artists utilizing Lethwei
Canadian Muay Thai practitioners
Canadian expatriate sportspeople in Thailand
Canadian expatriate sportspeople in Cyprus
Canadian expatriate sportspeople in Myanmar
Living people
Canadian sanshou practitioners
Canadian Jeet Kune Do practitioners